Betong Island is a group of islets in Southwest Penang Island District, Penang, Malaysia, located off the western coast of Penang Island.

It is situated within the parliamentary constituency of P53: Balik Pulau, and the state seat of N39: Pulau Betong. It is represented by MP Yusmadi Yusof in parliament from PKR, and state assembly member Sr. Farid Saad from BN representing the state seat. Betong Island was founded by Long Tambang, who came and built the first settlement along the river bank and along the beach.

See also
 List of islands of Malaysia

References 

Islands of Penang
Southwest Penang Island District